Oscar Ureña García (born 31 May 2003) is a Spanish professional footballer who plays as a winger for FC Cartagena, on loan from Girona FC.

Club career
Born in Figueres, Girona, Catalonia to Dominican parents, Ureña joined Girona FC's youth setup from hometown side UE Figueres. On 14 August 2021, before even having appeared with the reserves, he made his first team debut by starting in a 2–0 Segunda División home win against SD Amorebieta.

On 8 February 2022, Ureña renewed his contract with the club until 2025. On 16 January of the following year, he joined second division side FC Cartagena on loan until the end of the season.

References

External links

2003 births
Living people
People from Figueres
Sportspeople from the Province of Girona
Spanish footballers
Footballers from Catalonia
Association football wingers
La Liga players
Segunda División players
Tercera Federación players
Girona FC players
Girona FC B players
FC Cartagena footballers
Spanish people of Dominican Republic descent
Sportspeople of Dominican Republic descent